The modulation order of a digital communication scheme is determined by the number of the different symbols that can be transmitted using it.

Modulation order can only be defined for digital modulations. The simplest forms of digital modulation are of second order because they can transmit only two symbols (usually denoted as "0" and "1" or as "-1" and "1"). They are called binary shift keying (BSK).

Modulations which have an order of 4 and above usually are termed as higher-order modulations. Examples of these are quadrature phase shift keying (QPSK) and its generalisation as m-ary quadrature amplitude modulation (m-QAM).

Because existing computers and automation systems are based on binary logic most of the modulations have an order which is a power of two: 2, 4, 8, 16, etc. In principle, however, the order of a modulation can be any integer greater than one.

When the order of a digital modulation approaches infinity its properties approach those of the respective analog modulation. Thus the analogue modulations can be viewed as extreme cases of higher-order digital modulations for which the order is equal to infinity.

Telecommunication theory